"Something You Can Do with Your Finger" is the eighth episode of the fourth season of the animated television series South Park, and the 56th episode of the series overall. It is the 9th produced episode of Season 4. "Something You Can Do with Your Finger" originally aired in the United States on Comedy Central on July 12, 2000.

In the episode, the boys form their own boy band, and line up auditions for a spot as the fifth band member.

Plot synopsis 
Cartman dreams that he and the rest of the gang have become the next big boy band to sweep the nation, earning them, or at least him, the admiration of thousands of beautiful women and ten million dollars.  Convinced that his dream is a message from God, Cartman corrals Stan, Kyle and Kenny into assembling a band called "Fingerbang." However, Kyle notes that most boy bands have five members (using New Kids on the Block, the Backstreet Boys and 'N Sync as examples). As a result, they hold auditions for a fifth member. Wendy gets the job, despite Cartman's opposition to allowing a girl in a boy band.

Cartman tries to convince the manager of the local shopping mall to let them play a free show there, but is turned down.  Chef tells him that the key to success for this sort of band is to get some girls screaming, as girls' screams are very contagious.  Cartman gets the band to perform for a video, shot inexpertly by Timmy, and pays classmates to scream at them.  The mall manager reluctantly agrees despite the catastrophic quality of the video to give them the show.

Stan's father Randy inexplicably throws a fit when he discovers what his son is up to and forbids him to take part in the band. He eventually reveals that he was part of a boy band called "The Ghetto Avenue Boys" back in the 1980s. Randy dropped out of high school and left his friends and family behind to pursue this fame. Although initially wildly successful, the band was quickly replaced due to its members' getting "too old" to be part of a boy band. Deeply in debt and properly shamed, Randy was forced to sell his possessions and return home with the remainder of his earnings to complete his education.

However, after a heart-to-heart father-to-son conversation, Randy agrees to let Stan play, deciding that his son has to make his own mistakes in order to learn. The two rush to the mall for the show, where Cartman is desperately stalling for time while they try to find a replacement for Stan. Stan and Randy arrive in the nick of time but Kenny is crushed to death by an elevator, reducing their numbers once more to four. Randy gallantly steps in to replace Kenny and perform the song. When one of the few remaining listeners asks for an autograph afterwards, the group realises that, what with all this "fame" that they have acquired, they will never be able to live normal lives. They promptly break up the band.

Production
The mall manager is voiced by Marcus Vaughn, a friend of Trey Parker and Matt Stone who appeared in Parker's film Orgazmo as a "stunt cock." "Fingerbang" was going to be the name of Trey Parker and Matt Stone's band. They stated they thought this was a good idea for a short time, and later settled on their pornography-derived name, DVDA. On the DVD episode's commentary, the creators remarked this was the first episode where they really started to use the method of "straight-storytelling." Before this, almost all episodes had A-stories, B-stories, and C-stories, that would all come together in the end. In making this episode, the creators say that they learned that an episode can be about just one subject, with the characters' side stories all relating to the main idea.

The chief mall cop who uses pepper spray returns in the fifth-season episode "Cartmanland" as the security guard Cartman hires to guard his amusement park. Fingerbang briefly returned in the season 23 episode "Band in China."

Cultural references
Butters' audition song is "Little Bunny Foo Foo" (which has a similar melody to Alouette).

Wendy's audition song—"Mrs. Landers was a health nut"—is an adaptation of the traditional schoolyard rhyme "Miss Susie."

Randy's fit of rage, ending in him head-bashing the glass doors of a china cabinet and shouting "No! Nooo!!" parodies a scene in Star Trek: First Contact, in which Captain Picard, played by Patrick Stewart, acts in a similar manner. Randy's voice even changes from Parker's to a sampling of Stewart's voice from the film.

The band's name, Fingerbang, references the band Badfinger.

References

External links 

 "Something You Can Do With Your Finger" Full episode at South Park Studios
 

South Park (season 4) episodes
Musical television episodes
Cross-dressing in television